NASCAR: Dirt to Daytona is a racing simulator developed by Monster Games and published by Infogrames in November 2002 for the PlayStation 2 and GameCube. It features NASCAR's Dodge Weekly Racing Series (the only game to feature this series), Featherlite Modified Tour, Craftsman Truck Series, and the NASCAR Cup Series (originally, Winston was the title sponsor but due to ESRB rating of E for Everyone, all tobacco and alcohol related brands were censored, and in the case of Mark Martin, his No. 6 Viagra car was changed to the maker of the drug Pfizer based on the men's health variation of the scheme but without the men's health). The Dodge Weekly Racing Series (dirt street stock division) and Featherlite Modified Tour rosters consist of generic fantasy drivers. The Craftsman Truck Series also features fantasy drivers alongside real ones. The unique feature of having to work your way up through the ranks from the low tier Weekly Racing Series to the Cup Series would later return in EA Sports' NASCAR 2005: Chase for the Cup.

Strangely, pit stops and yellow flags are absent in the Featherlite Modified Tour, despite both being included in real life.

Reception

The game received "favorable" reviews on both platforms according to the review aggregation website Metacritic. It won GameSpots annual "Best Driving Game on GameCube" award.

References

External links

2002 video games
GameCube games
Infogrames games
Monster Games games
Multiplayer and single-player video games
NASCAR video games
North America-exclusive video games
PlayStation 2 games
Racing simulators
Simulation video games
Video games developed in the United States